Strumpfia is a monotypic genus of flowering plants in the family Rubiaceae. The genus contains only one species, viz. Strumpfia maritima, which is found from southern Florida to northern Venezuela. Strumpfia maritima is also the only species in the tribe Strumpfieae. It is an evergreen shrub of coastal areas that rarely exceeds  in height. Pride of Big Pine is a common name. Strumpfia was named by Nicolaus Jacquin in 1760 in his compilation entitled Enumeratio Systematis Plantarum. It was named for Christopher Strumpf, professor of chemistry and botany at Hall, in Magdeburg, and editor of Carl Linnaeus's .

References

External links 
 Strumpfia maritima In: Wildland Shrubs At: International Institute of Tropical Forestry At: International At: U.S. Forest Service
 Strumpfia, IPNI
 Strumpfia, page 8 and Strumpfia, page 28 In: Enumeratio systematica plantarum
 Strumpfia In: General History of the Dichlamydeous Plants In: A General System of Gardening and Botany (George Don)
 Strumpfia At: Index Nominum Genericorum, Smithsonian National Museum of Natural History
 Strumpfia, GRIN taxonomy for plants
 Strumpfia, UniProt

Cinchonoideae
Monotypic Rubiaceae genera
Flora of the Caribbean
Flora without expected TNC conservation status